Fara Filiorum Petri (locally La Farë) is a comune and town in the province of Chieti in the Abruzzo region of southern Italy.

See also
Farchie Festival

References

Cities and towns in Abruzzo